James Evans (born 5 November 1978) is an Australian former professional rugby league footballer who played in the 2000s and 2010s. Midway through the 2006 season, he was loaned to the Wakefield Trinity Wildcats and was released from his contract at the Huddersfield Giants at the end of the season. He announced his retirement from the game on 8 November 2010 after failing to recover from a groin injury.

Background
Evans was born in Canberra, Australian Capital Territory, Australia.

Australia
Evans started playing for the Canberra Raiders in 2001. He was injured in season 2002 against Parramatta after a strong start to the season. Evans collided with the goal post when scoring a try and required a complete knee reconstruction of all three ligaments of the knee, seeing him miss 12 months of football.

He was offered an opportunity to play with Huddersfield in the Super League where he played for three seasons. He was then loaned out after rumors of a rift with head coach Jon Sharp. Huddersfield's loss was Wakefields Trinity's gain as Evans secured top flight success with two tries in the Scratch night relegation battle against Castleford.

Evans was then courted by the Bradford Bulls for season 2007 where he was an instant hit scoring 15 tries in 23 games.

Bradford Bulls
Evans signed for Bradford for the 2007 season, and was an ever-present in the centres scoring 15 tries in 23 games. It was announced in September 2008 that Evans would leave the Bulls at the end of 2008 to join Castleford due to salary cap restrictions.

Statistics

Club career

References

External links
Profile at bradfordbulls.co.uk

1978 births
Living people
Australian people of Welsh descent
Australian rugby league players
Bradford Bulls players
Castleford Tigers players
Canberra Raiders players
Huddersfield Giants players
Rugby league centres
Rugby league five-eighths
Rugby league players from Canberra
Rugby league wingers
Wakefield Trinity players